Shahe Ajamian (1926–2005) was an archbishop of the Armenian Apostolic Church who managed the finances of the church in Jerusalem. Considered pro-Israeli, he maintained good relations with Mayor Teddy Kollek and sold land in the city to the Israeli government. In 1986, he was caught in a smuggling and bribery scandal along with Interior Ministry official .

References

1926 births
2005 deaths
Bishops of the Armenian Apostolic Church
People from Aleppo
Armenians in Jerusalem
Academic staff of Yerevan State University